The RS Quest is a British sailboat that was designed by Jo Richards as a sail trainer and day sailer. It was first built in 2015.

Production
The design has been built by RS Sailing in the United Kingdom, since September 2015 and remains in production.

Design
The boat was designed for the British Sea Cadets to replace their existing fleet of older boats and also as a family day sailer.

The RS Quest is a recreational sailing dinghy, with the hull built predominantly of rotomoulded Comptec PE3 polyethylene. It has a fractional sloop rig with aluminum spars and wire standing rigging. The hull has a nearly-plumb stem, a vertical transom, a transom-hung aluminum rudder controlled by a tiller and a retractable glassfibre centreboard. It displaces  and can carry  of crew weight or four adults.

Retracting the centreboard allows operation in shallow water, beaching or ground transportation on a trailer.

The boat may be optionally fitted with a small outboard motor for docking and maneuvering.

Optional equipment includes a polyethylene foredeck, trapeze, an outboard motor mount, a launching dolly and a boat trailer for ground transport.

The boat's hull is 100% recyclable and the box it is shipped in is 100% recyclable material, made from 100% managed woodland materials, with a high percentage of previously recycled material. The hull wrapping material is biologically-based, made from 51% sugar cane waste, officially classified in the UK as paper and is also 100% recyclable.

See also
List of sailing boat types

References

External links

Dinghies
2010s sailboat type designs
Sailing yachts
Sailboat type designs by Jo Richards
Sailboat types built by RS Sailing